Eirik Newth (born 17 August 1964) is a Norwegian astrophysicist, writer of popular science for children, and media personality.
He received the Brage Prize in 1996 for the children's book Jakten på sannheten.

He is the son of author and illustrator couple  Philip and Mette Newth, and a maternal grandson of writer couple Fridtjof and Lalli Knutsen.

Selected works
Se opp på vår egen stjernehimmel (1992)
Sola – vår egen stjerne (1994)
Jakten på sannheten – vitenskapens historie (1996)
Tallenes Verden (2002)
Neopangea (Science fiction novel, 2006)

Awards
Brage Prize 1996

External links
Personal blog

References

Norwegian people of English descent
1964 births
Living people
Norwegian astronomers
Norwegian children's writers
Norwegian science writers
University of Oslo alumni
People from Bærum